Görece may refer to:

 Görece, Çınar
 Görece, Menderes